Bob Berney (born 1953) is an American independent film executive based in Los Angeles. Currently, he is the CEO of Picturehouse, an independent motion picture marketing and distribution company that acquires, markets and distributes films from the U.S. and around the world. In September 2021, Picturehouse announced that it will release Becoming Cousteau, a documentary that uses previously unseen archival footage to chronicle the life and career of the adventurous oceanographer and filmmaker Jacques-Yves Cousteau, who coinvented scuba diving and foretold the impact of pollution on climate change. Directed by Liz Garbus, the film is scheduled to be released on October 22, 2021. In May 2021 the company released Fatima, a historical drama directed by Marco Pontecorvo and starring Joaquim de Almeida, Goran Višnjić, Stephanie Gil, Lúcia Moniz, Sônia Braga and Harvey Keitel.

Berney has guided the acquisition, marketing and/or distribution of many notable independent films, including Manchester by the Sea, Memento, My Big Fat Greek Wedding, The Passion of the Christ, Pan’s Labyrinth and Drive. The films he has been associated with have won multiple Academy Awards and grossed more than $1 billion at the North American box office.

Early years
Berney studied film history and production at the University of Texas at Austin. Before graduating with a B.A. in communications he was a manager and projectionist for AMC Theatres. Berney continued working for the theater chain until he left to renovate the Inwood Theatre in Dallas, which he and his partners reopened as an arthouse venue in 1984. After gaining this experience he served as a distribution executive for companies including FilmDallas (Kiss of the Spider Woman), Triton Pictures (A Brief History of Time, Hearts of Darkness) and Orion Classics (Theremin: An Electronic Odyssey, Prisoner of the Mountains,  Ulee's Gold). Berney released Todd Solondz’s Happiness under the Good Machine Releasing banner and Christopher Nolan’s Memento under the Newmarket Films banner. The success of the latter film led to the formation of Newmarket Films as a theatrical distribution company.

2000 to 2005
In October 2000 Berney became SVP, Marketing & Distribution at IFC Films, starting his tenure with the company in Los Angeles before moving to New York in 2001. Films acquired and theatrically released included Y Tu Mama Tambien, The Safety of Objects and My Big Fat Greek Wedding. In 2002 Berney founded Newmarket Films’ theatrical distribution division with Newmarket Capital Group owners Will Tyrer and Chris Ball. Their releases included Real Women Have Curves, Whale Rider, Monster and The Passion of the Christ.

Initial tenure with Picturehouse
In 2005 Berney was hired to launch Picturehouse, a joint venture created by Time Warner  subsidiaries New Line Cinema and HBO Films with the mandate to acquire, produce and distribute independent films. In its first two years of existence the company released features such as Robert Altman’s A Prairie Home Companion, starring Meryl Streep and Lily Tomlin; Guillermo del Toro’s Pan’s Labyrinth, which tallied six Oscar nominations and won in three categories; La Vie En Rose, which garnered Marion Cotillard an Oscar for Best Actress; and Sergei Bodrov’s Genghis Khan biopic Mongol, an Oscar nominee for Best Foreign Language Film.

2009 to 2012
Berney and producer/financier Bill Pohlad formed Apparition in August 2009. The company's projects included Bright Star, The Runaways and The Young Victoria. Next, Berney formed FilmDistrict with Graham King and Tim Headington of GK Films and released Insidious, Soul Surfer, Drive, Don't Be Afraid of the Dark, The Rum Diary and In the Land of Blood and Honey, Angelina Jolie’s directorial debut.

Reopening Picturehouse
In 2013 Berney and his wife Jeanne took ownership of Picturehouse and relaunched the label as an independent theatrical distributor. That same year they released Nimród Antal's Metallica Through the Never, a Grammy Award nominee for Best Music Film. The company's other initial releases included Adriana Trigiani’s Big Stone Gap, starring Ashley Judd, and Christian Keller's Gloria, with Sofía Espinosa.

Amazon Studios
Berney joined Amazon Studios in 2015 as head of marketing and distribution. There he built and oversaw the company's theatrical distribution arm and oversaw the release of more than 50 films including double Academy Award winner Manchester by the Sea (the first Oscar nominee for Best Picture released by a streaming platform), The Big Sick (Oscar nominee, Best Original Screenplay), Cold War (nominated for three Oscars, including Best Director) and The Salesman (Oscar winner, Best Foreign Language Film).

Picturehouse acquires Fatima
In 2019 Picturehouse acquired Fatima, a historical drama directed by Marco Pontecorvo and starring Joaquim de Almeida, Goran Višnjić, Stephanie Gil, Lúcia Moniz, Sônia Braga and Harvey Keitel.

Selected filmography
 Becoming Cousteau (2021) 
 Fatima (2020) 
 Cold War (2018) 
 The Big Sick (2017) 
 The Salesman (2016) 
 Manchester by the Sea (2016) 
 Gloria (2014)
 Big Stone Gap (2014)
 Metallica Through the Never (2013) 
 Insidious (2011)
 Soul Surfer (2011)
 Drive (2011)
 The Rum Diary (2011)
 In the Land of Blood and Honey (2011)
 Don't Be Afraid of the Dark (2011)
 The Runaways (2010)
 Bright Star (2009)
 The Young Victoria (2009)
 Mongol (2008)
 Kit Kittredge: An American Girl (2008)
 The Orphanage (2007)
 The King of Kong: A Fistful of Quarters (2007)
 La Vie En Rose (2007)
 Pan’s Labyrinth (2006)
 A Prairie Home Companion (2006)
 The Passion of the Christ (2004)
 Monster  (2003)
 Whale Rider (2003)
 Real Women Have Curves (2002) 
 My Big Fat Greek Wedding (2002)
 Y Tu Mama Tambien (2002)
 Memento (2001)
 Happiness (1998)
 A Brief History of Time (1992)
 Prisoner of the Mountains (1997)
  Ulee's Gold (1997)
 Theremin: An Electronic Odyssey (1993)
 Hearts of Darkness (1991)
 Kiss of the Spider Woman (1985)

References

External links
 
 

1953 births
Living people
American film studio executives
University of Texas at Austin alumni
American independent film production company founders